This is a list of cell phone providers in the Caribbean region. (As per their websites.)

See also 
 List of telephone_operating_companies
 List of mobile network operators of the Americas
 List of telecommunications regulatory bodies

External links 
 Caribbean Telecommunications Union

 
Caribbean
Mobile phone